Often referred to as “Soviet Pop Art”, Sots Art or soc art (short for Socialist Art) originated in the Soviet Union in the early 1970s as a reaction against the official aesthetic doctrine of the state— socialist realism, which was marked by reverential depictions of workers, peasants living happily in their communes, and, during Stalinism,  a young, fit Joseph Stalin.

Vitaly Komar and Alexander Melamid are credited with the invention of the term "Sots Art"; in an analogy with the Western pop art movement, which incorporated the kitchy elements of the Western mass culture, sots art capitalized on the imagery of the Socialist mass culture.

According to Arthur Danto, Sots Art's attack on official styles is similar in intent to American pop art and German capitalist realism.

Artists
 Grisha Bruskin
 Eric Bulatov
 Vitaly Komar
 Alexander Kosolapov
 Igor Novikov (painter)
 Alexander Melamid
 Dmitri Prigov
 Leonid Sokov

References

Further reading
 Regina Khidekel,  It’s the Real Thing: Soviet Sots-art and American Pop-art. Minnesota University Press, 1988
 Forbidden Art: The Postwar Russian Avant-Garde, Distributed Art Publishers, Inc.,1999, 

Modern art
Contemporary art movements